Leon Benbow (born July 23, 1950) is a retired American basketball player.

He played collegiately for the Jacksonville University.

He was selected by the Chicago Bulls in the 2nd round (27th pick overall) of the 1974 NBA Draft and by the San Diego Conquistadors in the seventh round of the 1974 ABA Draft.

He played for the Bulls (1974–76) in the NBA for 115 games.

References

External links

1950 births
Living people
African-American basketball players
Basketball players from Columbia, South Carolina
Chicago Bulls draft picks
Chicago Bulls players
Jacksonville Dolphins men's basketball players
San Diego Conquistadors draft picks
Shooting guards
American men's basketball players
21st-century African-American people
20th-century African-American sportspeople